The Pensions Regulator (TPR) is a non-departmental public body which regulates work-based pension schemes in the United Kingdom. Created under the Pensions Act 2004, the regulator replaced the Occupational Pensions Regulatory Authority (OPRA) from 6 April 2005 and has wider powers and a new proactive and risk-based approach to regulation.

The Occupational Pensions Regulatory Authority was established by the Pensions Act 1995 and came into full operation on 6 April 1997. It replaced the Occupational Pensions Board as the regulator of occupational pensions in the UK.

The Pensions Regulator has a clear set of objectives:

 to protect members’ benefits
 to reduce the risk of calls on the Pension Protection Fund (PPF)
 to promote, and to improve understanding of, the good administration of work-based pension schemes
 to maximise employer compliance with automatic enrolment duties;
 to minimise any adverse impact on the sustainable growth of an employer (in relation to the exercise of TPR’s functions under Part 3 of the Pensions Act 2004 only).

To meet these objectives The Pensions Regulator employs a risk-based approach, concentrating its resources on schemes which pose the greatest risk to the security of members’ benefits. The regulator also promotes high standards of scheme administration and works to ensure that those involved in running pension schemes have the necessary skills and knowledge.

David Norgrove was appointed the first chair of The Pensions Regulator in January 2005. After 2 terms, he was replaced by Michael O'Higgins (economist) in January 2011. Mark Boyle became Chair in 2014 and was reappointed for a second term.
Lesley Titcomb became chief executive in March 2015 and was replaced by Charles Counsell in April 2019. Mark Boyle stepped down in March 2021 and was replaced by Sarah Smart in April 2021, initially on an interim basis.

Recent high profile cases
Following the January 2018 collapse of construction and services company Carillion with extensive pension liabilities, The Pension Regulator faced calls that it should be scrapped and replaced by a new, more powerful body. The "excoriating" final report of the Parliamentary inquiry into the collapse of Carillion, published on 16 May 2018, described TPR as "feeble":

In June 2018, TPR's non-executive chairman, Mark Boyle, accepted the MPs' criticism but said the organisation's culture had changed to become clearer, quicker and tougher in its dealings with employers and pensions trustees. On 25 June 2018, TPR announced it was considering issuing a contribution notice – a legally enforceable demand for a financial contribution to the pension deficit – against former Carillion directors.

TPR is using its powers more often and testing powers it has not used previously. In the courts, it has brought prosecutions against 23 individuals or organisations in 2017-2019 for failure to provide information, wilful noncompliance with automatic enrolment duties and recklessly providing false or misleading information to TPR, fraud and compute misuse.

In 2018, TPR engaged with a range of schemes that they were concerned were at risk of contagion as a result of the collapse of Carillion. It made use of available intelligence to target schemes covering liabilities of £85.5bn and more than 800,000 members.

In cases where TPR has initiated anti-avoidance action by issuing a Warning Notice it has recovered more than £1bn, often through the use of settlement, avoiding a costly litigation process.

In February 2017, TPR agreed a cash settlement worth up to £363 million with Sir Philip Green in relation to the BHS pension scheme. The arrangement, which gained the support of the trustees of the two BHS pension schemes, provided funding for a new independent pension scheme to give pensioners the option of the same starting pension as they were originally promised by BHS, and higher benefits than they would get from the Pension Protection Fund (PPF).

In December 2018, it was announced that Southern Water will pay more money into its pension scheme over a shorter recovery period following an investigation by TPR. TPR took action over what it felt was an imbalance between the funds contributed to the Southern Water Pension Scheme and the level of dividends paid to shareholders in 2016 and 2017.

In June 2017, TPR agreed a £74 million settlement for a third defined benefit (DB) pension scheme as part of its anti-avoidance investigation into thread manufacturer Coats Group Plc (Coats).

TPR's new approach 
Through its TPR Future programme, TPR has completed a review of its entire approach to regulation and has started to implement a new regulatory model to drive up standards and tackle risk by engaging proactively with a larger proportion of the schemes and employers it regulates.

TPR's 'Making workplace pensions work' is a guide to its new way of operating.

References

External links
 Official website

Pensions in the United Kingdom
Non-departmental public bodies of the United Kingdom government
Department for Work and Pensions
2005 establishments in the United Kingdom
Regulators of the United Kingdom
Pension regulation